Laevistrombus turturella is a species of sea snail, a marine gastropod mollusc in the family Strombidae (true conches). It is one of seven living species currently recognized as valid in its genus.

Distribution
Philippines area.

Taxonomy
There is some disagreement in the literature as to whether or not this taxon and the similar-looking Laevistrombus canarium are actually separate species. Man In 'T Veld & Turck (1998) considered that L. canarium and L. turturella are distinct (yet sympatric) species, based mainly on the shell morphology and a radula comparison. However, when Cob et. al. reviewed a number of Strombus species in 2009, examining both shell characters and anatomical data including details of the genitalia, operculum and radula, he concluded that L. turturella was simply a morphotype, and therefore a synonym of L. canarium. In 2019, Maxwell et al. examined the early teleoconch (upper post-larval shell spiral) morphology of specimens of Laevistrombus species; they treated L. turturella as a valid species, and elevated several names synonymized with L. canarium or L. turturella to full species status.

References

Strombidae
Gastropods described in 1798